Marsinah (10 April 1969 – 8 May 1993) was an independent trade unionist employed in a watch factory in East Java, Indonesia, whose murder drew international attention to the Suharto dictatorship's brutal repression of workers.

Marsinah was serving as a negotiator for 500 workers striking over failure to implement the minimum wage and trade union autonomy. On May 4, she was kidnapped following a demonstration; her body was found four days later. The military is widely believed to have been involved in her disappearance and subsequent death.

Early life 
The second child of Sumini and Mastin, Marsinah grew up under the care of her grandmother, Puirah, and her aunt Sini, in Nglundo, East Java. She went to school at Karangasem Public School 189, subsequently Nganjuk No.5 Middle School. Her girlhood years were marked with commerce, selling snacks in order to augment her grandmother and aunt's incomes. Marsinah's final school years were spent at the Muhammadiyah Boarding School, her educational advancement being denied due to lack of money.

Factory worker 
Unable to find employment in Nglundo, Marsinah turned her attention to the big cities, sending in job applications to Surabaya, Mojokerto and Gresik. Hired by Bata Shoes to work at their Surabaya factory in 1989, she moved a year later to the Catur Putra Surya (formerly Empat Putra Surya) watch factory in Sidoarjo. Making a lateral transfer to their Porong factory after its opening, Marsinah eventually found herself serving as spokesperson for her fellow workers.

Trade unionist 
When, in 1993, the Governor of East Java announced a raise in the provincial minimum wage, Catur Putra Surya (a company with ties to the Indonesian military–industrial complex) refused to comply. On 3-4 May workers went on strike demanding implementation of the minimum wage and the local unit of the state-controlled union, SPSI, be disbanded.  Marsinah went to the Indonesian Ministry of Labor to retrieve a copy of the gubernatorial directive to deliver to the CPS management.

Murder 
On 5 May the Sidoarjo District Military Command summoned 13 workers to its headquarters and forced them to sign letters of resignation, with 8 more to follow in the next couple of days. Outraged by this turn of events, Marsinah decided to go there herself and demand an explanation that very same day. She was never seen alive again.

Campaigns for justice 
In 2002 Indonesian President Megawati Soekarnoputri approved an investigation by the Human Rights Commission.

Legacy 
She was posthumously awarded the Yap Thiam Hien Award, and her murder was officially noted by the International Labour Organization as Case# 1773.

References

Indonesian trade unionists
1969 births
1993 deaths